Ana Beatriz Vázquez Argibay (born 15 September 1949), better known as Ana Marzoa, is an Argentine-Spanish actress.

Biography
The daughter of Galician emigrants, Ana Marzoa was born in Buenos Aires, and from a very young age she studied theater, classical dance, teaching, and music.

Career
In 1971, Marzoa moved to Spain, where she has developed almost her entire professional career.

Marzoa has been present on Spanish stages for more than three decades, where she has played a large number of characters. Among her creations most celebrated by critics and the public is Rosaura in the play Life Is a Dream by Calderón de la Barca, directed by José Luis Gómez.

Her popularity began to grow rapidly after appearing on the television series  and Segunda enseñanza by Ana Diosdado and Pedro Masó.

In 2017 she debuted on the Antena 3 series Pulsaciones, which had a closed plot and concluded in its first season.

Filmography

Theater

Television

Film
 Blum by Julio Porter (1970)
 Los amantes by Manuel J. Catalán (1973)
  by Osías Wilenski (1974)
 The Bananas Boat by Sidney Hayers (1976)
 El día del presidente by Pedro Ruiz (1979)
 ¡Qué verde era mi duque! by José María Forqué (1980)
 Palmira by José Luis Olaizola (1982)
  by Manolo Matji (1987) 
  by Pedro Masó (1999) 
 Calle Libertad by Begoña Saugar (2004)

Awards
 Fotogramas de Plata Award: nominee in 1983 (for the series Anillos de oro), in 1993 (for the play A Streetcar Named Desire), and in 1996 (for the play An Ideal Husband)
 María Guerrero Award (1985)
 Miguel Mihura Award (for the 1985–86 season), for the plays Punishment without Revenge and El concierto de San Ovidio
 National Theater Prize (1986)
  (2000), for the play Madrugada

References

External links
 

1949 births
20th-century Argentine actresses
20th-century Spanish actresses
21st-century Argentine actresses
21st-century Spanish actresses
Actresses from Buenos Aires
Argentine emigrants to Spain
Argentine film actresses
Argentine stage actresses
Argentine television actresses
Living people
Spanish film actresses
Spanish stage actresses
Spanish television actresses